Cathy Caverzasio (born 28 September 1972) is a Swiss born former professional tennis player who represented both Italy and her native country.

Biography
Caverzasio won her first ITF title as a 14 year old in 1987 and was aged only 16 when she first appeared for the Italy Fed Cup team in 1988. On her Federation Cup debut, she partnered with Laura Garrone to win the decisive doubles rubber in a World Group tie against Poland. As a junior, Caverzasio was runner-up in the girls' doubles at two Grand Slam tournaments, 1988 US Open and 1989 French Open. Her best performance on the WTA Tour was a runner-up finish at the 1989 Mantegazza Cup in Taranto, and the following year she reached her career-best ranking of 34 in the world.

In 1991, she switched allegiances to her country of birth Switzerland. She was a member of the Swiss team which made it to the 1991 Federation Cup quarterfinals, where they were beaten by Czechoslovakia. For the doubles against Czechoslovakia, she partnered with Manuela Maleeva in what was a dead rubber, which the Swiss pair won after their opponents Jana Novotná and Regina Rajchrtová lost the first set, then abandoned the match in the second.

Her child, Kilian Feldbausch is also a tennis player.

WTA career finals

Singles: 1 (runner-up)

Doubles: 1 (runner-up)

ITF finals

Singles (2–0)

References

External links
 
 
 

1972 births
Living people
Italian female tennis players
Swiss female tennis players
Swiss emigrants to Italy
Tennis players from Geneva